Pennsylvania Route 409 (PA 409) is a  state highway located in Bradford County in Pennsylvania.  Its southern terminus is at U.S. Route 6 (US 6) in Wyalusing Township, and its northern terminus is at PA 706 in Camptown. It runs through rural areas in eastern Bradford County as a two-lane undivided road. It was designated onto its present alignment on May 27, 1935, running between US 6/US 309 in Limehill and US 106 (now PA 706) in Camptown.

Route description 

PA 409 begins at an intersection with US 6 (the Grand Army of the Republic Highway) in the hamlet of Homets Ferry in Wyalusing Township. The route heads to the northeast, crossing an old alignment of US 6 in the middle of fields before heading into the woodlands nearby, making a gradual curve out along a stagecoach road. The scenery changes from fields back to woodlands until Comiskey Road, where PA 409 turns eastward through fields and passes a lone residence. After intersecting with a dirt road, the highway enters a large patch of forestry, paralleling nearby Billings Creek Road before entering the village of Camptown. In Camptown, PA 409 heads eastward through some residences before intersecting with PA 706 and State Route 1017 (Herrickville Road). This intersection is the northern terminus of PA 409.

History
When Pennsylvania legislated routes in 1911, the present-day PA 409 corridor was designated as part of Legislative Route 14, which ran from Towanda to Montrose. PA 409 was designated on May 27, 1935 to run from US 6/US 309 in Limehill east to US 106 (now PA 706) in Camptown. Upon designation, the entire length of the route was paved. PA 409 has remained on the same alignment since.

Major intersections

See also

References

External links 

Pennsylvania Highways: PA 409

409
Transportation in Bradford County, Pennsylvania